Urban Cowboy is a 1980 American romantic Western film directed by James Bridges. The plot concerns the love-hate relationship between Buford Uan "Bud" Davis (John Travolta) and Sissy (Debra Winger). The film's success was credited for spurring a mainstream revival of country music. Much of the action revolves around activities at Gilley's Club, a football-field-sized  honky tonk in Pasadena, Texas.

Plot
Buford "Bud" Davis, a native of Spur, Texas, moves to Houston to take a job at an oil refinery where his uncle, Bob Davis, is employed. His goal is to make enough money to return to Spur and buy some land. While staying with Bob and his family, Bud embraces the local nightlife, including spending many nights at Gilley's, a bar and nightclub in Pasadena.

One night, Bud meets a woman named Sissy at Gilley's. They fall in love, marry soon after and move into a brand-new mobile home. Although they love each other, they quarrel often. Sissy is feisty and independent, while hot-tempered Bud believes in traditional gender roles. Their lives settle into a routine of working during the day and spending time at Gilley's at night, where Bud likes to ride the mechanical bull. When Sissy expresses interest in riding it herself, Bud forbids it.

Recently-paroled convict Wes Hightower lands a job at Gilley's operating the mechanical bull. When he flirtatiously tips his hat at Sissy, a drunken Bud becomes enraged and gets into a fistfight with him. Sissy, along with her friend Jessie, spends time during the day at Gilley's where Wes teaches Sissy how to ride the mechanical bull. One night at Gilley's, wanting to impress Bud, Sissy rides the bull, but Bud becomes angry that she defied him. When Bud falls off during his second ride, Wes intentionally swings the bull around hard, breaking Bud's arm. At home, Bud and Sissy debate over her riding the bull again. When she insists that she will and assumes Bud was jealous of her riding it better than he does, Bud slaps her and throws her out of the mobile home. Soon after, Bud sees Sissy at Gilley's. She refuses to speak to him, so Bud retaliates by dancing with a beautiful girl named Pam, the daughter of a rich oilman. He leaves with Pam, making sure that Sissy sees them in order to make her jealous. The next morning, she moves in with Wes who lives in a run-down trailer behind Gilley's.

Bud wants to compete in Gilley's upcoming mechanical bull riding contest in which the winner will be awarded $5,000. While Bud is away training with Bob, a former rodeo champion, Sissy returns to Bud's mobile home to gather her belongings. While there, she cleans the mobile home and leaves Bud a note saying that she hopes that they can get back together. Pam arrives while Sissy is still there, but Sissy leaves shortly thereafter. Pam then discovers Sissy's note and throws it away after reading it. Pam lets Bud believe that she cleaned the mobile home while he was out. Sissy arrives back at Wes's trailer and catches him with Marshalene, a woman who works at Gilley's. After Marshalene leaves, an angry Sissy throws a carton of cigarettes at him and refuses to fix him a meal.  In response, Wes physically abuses her.

Bob urges Bud to make up with Sissy, citing how his own formerly bad behavior nearly ended his marriage. Shortly after, Bob is killed in an accidental explosion at the refinery. Sissy attends the funeral and tells Bud that Wes was fired from Gilley's and is unable to find another job. She says that she and Wes plan to go to Mexico after Wes wins the $5,000 award money at the mechanical bull riding contest that night.

Bud plans to skip the competition, but his Aunt Corene encourages him to go, saying that Bob would have wanted him to compete. Bud wins the contest but then expresses disappointment that Sissy is not there to see the $5,000 awarded. Pam realizes that Bud still loves Sissy. She tells Bud about Sissy's note that she discarded and that she does not really love him, then urges Bud to reconcile with Sissy. While Sissy is waiting in her car in the parking lot, Wes goes inside Gilley's to rob Bud's $5,000 award money. Bud finds Sissy in the parking lot, tells her that he still loves her and apologizes for hitting her. They reconcile, but after seeing Sissy's bruised face, a furious Bud goes after Wes, and a fight ensues inside the bar. Wes drops his gun, and the stolen cash falls from his jacket. Gilley's staff, discovering the robbery, apprehend Wes. Bud and Sissy leave together, heading for home.

Cast

Historical background and production
The film's screenplay was adapted by Aaron Latham and James Bridges from an article by the same name in Esquire written by Latham. The original Esquire article centered on the romance between two Gilley's regulars named Dew Westbrook and Betty Helmer. Westbrook and Helmer's real-life relationship became the inspiration for the on-screen romance between John Travolta's and Debra Winger's characters "Bud" and "Sissy". The movie was directed by Bridges. Some film critics referred to the movie as a country music version of Saturday Night Fever. The film grossed almost $47 million in the United States alone and represented a temporary recovery for Travolta from 1978's poorly received Moment by Moment, but the film was not nearly as successful as either Saturday Night Fever ($94 million) or Grease ($188 million).

While filming Urban Cowboy, Travolta had a private corner at the Westheimer Road location of the Ninfa's restaurant chain in Houston.

Urban Cowboy was the first motion picture to be choreographed by Patsy Swayze, which launched her career as a film choreographer.

Critical reception and legacy

The film received generally positive reviews from critics. On Rotten Tomatoes, the film received a 70% "Fresh" rating based on 23 reviews. "Urban Cowboy is not only most entertaining but also first-rate social criticism," said Vincent Canby of The New York Times.  Variety wrote: "Director James Bridges has ably captured the atmosphere of one of the most famous chip-kicker hangouts of all: Gilley's Club on the outskirts of Houston."

The film gave Pasadena and Houston a brief turn under the Hollywood spotlight. Andy Warhol, Jerry Hall and many other celebrities attended the premiere in Houston.  Mickey Gilley's career was revived after the film release, and the soundtrack started a music movement.

As a result of the film's success, there was a mainstream revival of country music. The term "Urban Cowboy" was also used to describe the soft-core country music of the early 1980s epitomized by Kenny Rogers, Dolly Parton, Johnny Lee, Mickey Gilley, Janie Frickie and other vocalists whose trademarks were mellow sounds of the sort heard in the movie. This sound became a trademark in country music from the early to mid '80s, in which record sales for the genre soared.

Soundtrack

The film featured a hit soundtrack album spawning numerous Top 10 Billboard Country Singles, such as #1 "Lookin' for Love" by Johnny Lee, #1 "Stand by Me" by Mickey Gilley, #3 (AC chart) "Look What You've Done to Me" by Boz Scaggs, #1 "Could I Have This Dance" by Anne Murray, and #4 "Love the World Away" by Kenny Rogers. It also included songs that were hits from earlier years such as #1 "The Devil Went Down to Georgia" by the Charlie Daniels Band and "Lyin' Eyes" by the Eagles.  The film is said to have started the 1980s boom in pop-country music known as the "Urban Cowboy Movement", also known as Neo-Country or Hill Boogie. In December 2018, the soundtrack was certified triple platinum by the RIAA for sales of three million copies.

Released as a double LP, re-released on CD in 1995.

TV series adaptation
On May 28, 2015, it was announced that 20th Century Fox Television had teamed with Paramount Television to adapt Urban Cowboy into a television series, and set Craig Brewer to write and direct the pilot, as well as to executive produce the whole series. Chris Levinson was set as the showrunner and would also executive produce the series, along with Robert Evans and Sue Naegle. In December, Fox cancelled the pilot. On February 1, 2022, it was announced that a television adaptation was in development at Paramount+, with James Ponsoldt serving as director and co-writer alongside Benjamin Percy.

See also

 Country music

References

External links

 
 
 
 
 
 Production: Urban Cowboy – Working in the Theatre Seminar video at American Theatre Wing.org, April 2003

1980 films
1980 romantic drama films
American romantic drama films
Country music films
1980s English-language films
Films directed by James Bridges
Films set in Houston
Films shot in Houston
Paramount Pictures films
Films based on newspaper and magazine articles
Films about domestic violence
Films produced by Robert Evans
Rodeo in film
1980s American films